Dolgov may refer to:

Alexander Dmitrievich Dolgov  (born 1941), Russian cosmologist and a professor at Novosibirsk State University.
Dumitru Dolgov (born 1987), Moldovan footballer who is currently a free agent
Nikolai Dolgov (born 1946), retired Soviet football player and a current Russian manager
Oleg A. Dolgov (born 1972), Russian singer (tenor)
Oleg V. Dolgov (born 1952), Russian Soviet scientist
Pyotr Dolgov (1920–1962), Soviet Air Force colonel and Hero of the Soviet Union
Vladimir Dolgov (born 1960), former backstroke swimmer from the Soviet Union
Yevgeni Dolgov (born 1969), retired Soviet and Russian football player

Russian-language surnames